Adele Wood is an English former international table tennis player.

Table tennis career
She won a silver medal at the 1949 World Table Tennis Championships in the Corbillon Cup (women's team event) with Pinkie Barnes, Joan Crosby and Peggy Franks for England.

Wood played her last representative match in 1958, after marrying Len Pettifer.

See also
 List of England players at the World Team Table Tennis Championships
 List of World Table Tennis Championships medalists

References

English female table tennis players
Possibly living people
World Table Tennis Championships medalists